Aleuron iphis is a moth of the family Sphingidae. It was described by Francis Walker in 1856

Distribution 
Is found from Mexico, Belize, Guatemala, Nicaragua, Costa Rica to Venezuela, Bolivia and Brazil.

Description 
The wingspan is 52–57 mm.

Biology 
 Adults are on wing from at least July to January in Costa Rica.
 The larvae feed on Tetracera volubilis, Curatella americana and probably other Dilleniaceae species.

References

Aleuron
Moths described in 1856
Moths of North America
Moths of South America